Dmitry Maleshin is a Russian lawyer, scholar and author in the field of civil procedural law, legal education. He has authored more than 80 peer reviewed articles, as well as contributing to a number of text books and other works. He is currently professor at Moscow State University and a Visiting Professor at Saint-Petersburg University and Higher School of Economics.

Education, teaching and advisory work
Maleshin received his degrees from Moscow State University in 1999 (Equivalent of J.D)), 2002 (Equivalent of Ph.D), 2011 (Doctor of Law). He is a professor of civil procedural law at Moscow State University. 
He has also taught and scholared at a number of universities including:
 Higher School of Economics, Professor of civil procedural law since 2014:
 Moscow State University, Vice-Dean of Law Faculty in 2003-2013;
 Tyumen State University, Advisor of the Law Faculty since 2014;
 Harvard Law School, Visiting Scholar in 2008; 
 Yale Law School, Visiting Scholar in 2004.
In 2013 Maleshin participated in the Dean's elections at the Law Faculty of Moscow State University and got a majority vote, but the elections were declared invalid. That fact was highly illuminated by Russian mass-media: Kommersant, TVrain, and Izvestia.

Academic journals
He is the editor-in-chief of the 
 Russian Law Journal 
 BRICS Law Journal
Member of the editorial boards of the following academic journals:
 Civil Procedure Review
 Herald of Civil Procedure
 University of Bologna Law Review (general student-edited law journal)

Membership
He has served as a member on a wide variety of international and Russian working groups, committees and association including:
 International Association of Procedural Law, member of the Council since 2007:
 International Law Association, member of the International Civil Litigation Committee, 2006-2012:
 International Association of Judicial Independence and World Peace, member since 2013.
 Academic Council of the Moscow State University Law Faculty since 2003
 Russian Association of Legal Education, member of the Council since 2008
 Association of lawyers of Russia, Executive of the Moscow regional office in 2008-2012

International projects
Selected international events organised by Dmitry Maleshin:
 First Siberian Legal Forum, "Specialisation of Judges and Courts" Tyumen city, October 17–18, 2014
 Second Siberian Legal Forum, "Administrative Justice: Comparative and Russian Contexts” Tyumen city, September 29–30, 2016
Participated in the following international research projects:
 Funding and Costs in Civil Litigation, organised by University of Oxford Centre for Socio-Legal Studies

Selected publications
 Editorial. Civil Procedure in Cross-Cultural Dialogue: Eurasia Context
 Russian Style of Civil Procedure
 Some Cultural Characteristics of the New Russian Code of Civil Procedure of 2002 
 The Crisis of Russian Legal Education in Comparative Perspective 
 Civil Procedure in Russia, Third edition

References

External links
Zakon.ru
Works.bepress.com 
Ceapj.udg.edu

Lawyers from Moscow
Year of birth missing (living people)
Living people
Moscow State University alumni
Academic staff of Moscow State University